The Harlequin is the name of four clown-themed DC Comics characters.

The original Harlequin was a foe of the Golden Age Green Lantern and later became his wife. The second Harlequin originally debuted as the Joker's Daughter and was a member of the Teen Titans. The third Harlequin was a member of the Injustice Unlimited supervillain team and battled Infinity, Inc. The fourth Harlequin has only appeared on a few occasions and is an enemy of Alan Scott.

Joker's daughter becomes Harlequin in Teen Titans #48.

Publication history
The Molly Mayne version of the Harlequin first appeared in All-American Comics #89 and was created by Robert Kanigher and Irwin Hasen.

The Marcie Cooper version of the Harlequin first appeared in Infinity, Inc. #46 and was created by Roy Thomas.

The unidentified Harlequin first appeared in Green Lantern Corps Quarterly #5 and was created by Ron Marz and Jim Balent.

The Harlequin appears in All-New Batman: The Brave and the Bold #7 (July 2011).

Fictional character biography

Molly Mayne

The original Harlequin was Molly Mayne who appeared in stories alongside the Golden Age Green Lantern (Alan Scott).

Mayne developed a crush on Scott and, donning a colorful costume (which included harlequin glasses, a conical hat and a mandolin), started a life of crime to attract his attention. Her crimes tended to be harmless and mostly for show, although the two clashed on several occasions in the late 1940s.

She briefly joined the Injustice Society until she turned on them by aiding the Justice Society of America. She had a deep running altruistic streak, which occasionally led her to join forces with her enemy/would-be love interest. Despite being attracted to the Harlequin, Scott never entered into a relationship with her and she eventually gave up in despair. She made a deal with the government in which she went on intelligence missions in return for amnesty for her past crimes and then quietly retired. On one occasion, she assisted Green Lantern, Superman and Lois Lane in capturing another foe of her love, the Sportsmaster.

Years later, after the death of his first wife Rose Canton, Alan Scott realized that he had loved Molly all this time and they got married. As the years passed a problem developed for the two; the Starheart (which gave Scott his powers) had reversed his aging processes, so he was physically a young man while Molly had since aged into an old woman.

In despair over the rift this had caused between them, Molly sold her soul to the demon Neron in return for youth during the "Underworld Unleashed" storyline. Her body became that of a young woman (who had the power to create nightmares) but her soul remained in Hell. Scott fought his way through Hell to obtain it and, with the help of the young Green Lantern Kyle Rayner, returned it to the Harlequin's body. This resulted in re-aging Molly, but making her whole once again. Some time thereafter, Scott himself was returned to his true physical age, as well. Mayne and Scott remain happily married to this day.

During the Brightest Day crossover event, Molly briefly appears when Alan's daughter Jenny arrives at the Scott home in search of her father's old lantern. Molly informs her stepdaughter that Alan had been depressed in recent weeks, as Jenny had not been to visit her family since her resurrection at the close of the Blackest Night crossover event. Later, a doppelganger of the younger, villainous Molly is created by Alan's ring after he goes insane and battles the Justice League. The doppelganger is briefly seen torturing Starman.

A panel in "The New Golden Age" one-shot revealed that Harlequin has a son named Michael Mayne through an unknown man. Michael would later become Harlequin's Son utilizing some of his mother's technology.

Duela Dent

Duela Dent is the second character to use the Harlequin name. The character was introduced in Batman Family #6 (July/August 1976). Originally appearing as a villain, she called herself the Joker's Daughter, and not only claimed to be the daughter of the Joker, but also of the Catwoman, the Scarecrow, the Riddler and the Penguin as well. In Pre-Crisis continuity, she later revealed her true father was Two-Face, joined the Teen Titans and renamed herself the Harlequin.

Duela's age has been retconned many times during the course of her history. When introduced she was a teenage girl; however, in later books, she was portrayed as a much older woman. Recently, she has been returned to a far younger age.

In current continuity, Duela continues to claim various supervillains as her parent. Freely alternating between heroic and villainous roles, Duela is considered a delusional former member of the original Teen Titans, but later becomes a member of the evil Titans East. She later betrays Titans East when offered membership with the current team.

Soon after, Duela is killed by a rogue Monitor in issue #1 of Countdown, following a failed kidnapping attempt on a celebrity and pursuit from Jason Todd. It is later revealed that she is a native of Earth-3 and the biological daughter of the Jokester and Three-Face (Evelyn Dent), that world's heroic equivalents of the Joker and Two-Face.

Marcie Cooper

As a youth, Marcie Cooper was recruited by the Grandmaster to join the Manhunters. Her grandfather, Dan Richards (a.k.a. the Manhunter), also encouraged her to join the group as he had years ago. The Manhunters gave her a job working at KGLX radio in Gotham City, alongside Molly Mayne-Scott, who was a former agent called the Harlequin. Marcie began dating Northwind and later Obsidian, both of Infinity, Inc., and infiltrated the super-team from within.

When the Manhunters began to strike at Earth, Marcie stole Molly's illusion-casting glasses, taking the identity of the Harlequin. She failed to recruit Obsidian to the Manhunters and tried to kill her grandfather after he betrayed the Manhunters. Dan Richards was later killed by the Manhunter Mark Shaw.

Single-minded in her attempt to destroy Infinity, Inc., she joined Injustice Unlimited and masterminded the assassination of Skyman: it was on the wedding night of Hector Hall and Lyta Trevor; the Harlequin posed as Jade and used Solomon Grundy as her pawn in killing Skyman. She then took Grundy, gathered the Dummy and took the pair to meet with Artemis, the Icicle II and Hazard. The plan to murder the Infinitors was told to all and put into action. Pat Dugan was used as bait to bring the heroes to Stellar Studios, but the battle went bad for the villains. When Solomon Grundy realized he had been manipulated by the Harlequin, he savagely beat her. Afterwards, she was given over to the authorities.

The Harlequin has not been heard from since (though Roy Thomas has stated that she was not killed).

Cooper did make a cameo appearance in Alan Scott's dream sequence.

Some readers have speculated that she may be the mysterious Harlequin introduced in Green Lantern Quarterly #5-6 (summer and fall 1993). This new Harlequin is shown standing next to the Golden Glider in Underworld Unleashed #1 (November 1995), whom some misinterpreted as being Marcie Cooper herself. Another piece of speculation entails Marcie Cooper having been the Marcy from Secret Origins (vol. 2) #20 (November 1987) and Batgirl Special #1 (1988). That last idea was tentatively acknowledged by Millennium Index #1 (1987).

Unknown

A mysterious new Harlequin debuted in Green Lantern Corps. Quarterly #5-6 and battled Alan Scott.

As a little girl, she discovered she had illusion-casting powers. She learned all about the first Green Lantern, Alan Scott, and how the first Harlequin became his lover. She knew it was her destiny to become the next Harlequin and to be with Green Lantern.

She created illusions of Icicle and Solomon Grundy for Alan Scott to battle and then revealed herself to him. During that encounter, Scott mysteriously regained his youth. Though at first he thought this an illusion, he later learned that the original consciousness of the Starheart had been reawakened and M'La had been tortured and slain.

During her battles with Scott, she eventually attacked his wife, Molly Mayne-Scott (the first Harlequin). She created illusions of a decrepit version of Molly, while she flooded Scott's head with visions of them together (in space, as barbarians, as detectives and eventually as medieval warriors). Scott was able to break free when he unleashed his simmering rage against her and showed her a world where he ruled over Hell and she was his captive slave. She stopped the battle, fled shouting that he had ruined everything, and instantly disappeared into the air.

During the Underworld Unleashed crossover event, the unknown Harlequin appeared in Hell alongside the other villains summoned by Neron in Underworld Unleashed #1. The unknown Harlequin returned and made an appearance in Alan's dream sequence.

Powers and abilities
The primary tool of the Molly Mayne version of the Harlequin was her glasses. The glasses were later explained as a gift from the Manhunters as one of their agents. By using the glasses, she was able to project realistic three-dimensional holograms and fire energy blasts. In recent years, the glasses enabled an aged Molly to "maintain" the physical vitality of her youth's athleticism. Her secondary tool is a mandolin with an extending handle which she uses as a defensive weapon, especially against the Golden Age Green Lantern (due to his ring's weakness to its wooden construction).

The Marcie Cooper version of the Harlequin wears special glasses that allows her to hypnotize people and to create realistic illusions in the minds of the people around her. She can even project illusions over television. She also wields a mandolin with an extending handle that can be used as a weapon. A psychopathic killer, she is not afraid to do whatever it takes to destroy her opponents.

The unidentified Harlequin has illusion-casting powers similar to her predecessors. However, her illusions are much more intense and powerful than the illusions cast by Molly Mayne and Marcie Cooper, which were created from their glasses. When casting her illusions, if the victim has any doubt that the illusion is not real, they will feel the pain that her illusion is inflicting on them.

Other versions

Kingdom Come
A new Joker's Daughter appeared in the Kingdom Come miniseries and The Kingdom: Offspring #1. She is identified as both the Joker's Daughter and the Harlequin in annotations for the series and according to Alex Ross. The card set calls her a riot girl, who is "one of many to follow the Joker's chaotic style". She is not related to either Duela Dent or the Joker.

It has been stated that the Kingdom Come storyline is now Earth-22 in the DC Multiverse. Previously, it was called Earth-96 in the first Multiverse.

Miscellaneous
 The Harlequin was ranked 100th in Comics Buyer's Guide's "100 Sexiest Women in Comics" list, although this list does not specify which version of the character was chosen.

See also
 Harley Quinn

Notes

References

External links
Molly Mayne
 All-American Comics #89 (First Appearance)
 Comic Book Database: Harlequin I
 GA Villain Checklist Profile
 The Unofficial Harlequin 1 Biography

Duela Dent
 Comic Book Database: Harlequin II
 Comic Book Database: Joker's Daughter 
 Duela Dent History
 Obscure Characters: Card Queen
 Titans Tower: Duela Dent
 The Unofficial Harlequin 2 Biography
 Unpublished Duela Dent story from Vixen #1

Marcie Cooper
 Cosmic Team Profile
 Cosmic Team Profile II
 The Unofficial Harlequin 3 Biography

Others
 Harlequin Profiles
 Kingdom Come #1 Annotations
 Kingdom Come #4 Annotations
 Secret Origins of Infinity, Inc.

Articles about multiple fictional characters
Characters created by Ron Marz
Characters created by Roy Thomas
Characters created by Robert Kanigher
Comics characters introduced in 1947
Comics characters introduced in 1976
Comics characters introduced in 1985
Comics characters introduced in 1993
DC Comics female superheroes
DC Comics female supervillains
Fictional characters who have made pacts with devils
Fictional clowns
Fictional detectives
Fictional illusionists
Fictional murderers
Golden Age supervillains
Green Lantern characters
Vigilante characters in comics